The KH-2002 Khaybar is an Iranian-designed assault rifle, derived from the DIO S 5.56 assault rifle (an unlicensed clone of the Chinese Norinco CQ, which in turn is an unlicensed copy of the American M16) and further developed by Iran's Defense Industries Organization (DIO). It was designed in 2001 with samples produced in 2003 with the eventual production of the KH2002 commencing in 2004. It is similar in appearance to the FAMAS.

Its improved version, released in 2009, was known as "Sama".

History

In the early 2000s, Iran was testing prototypes of G3 battle rifles made under license for the Iranian military in bullpup configurations to test their feasibility. This was later dropped in favor of a similar weapon that's chambered in 5.56 NATO.

According to a Global Security Studies report, it was observed that Venezuela received 18,000 KH-2002s sold to them by Iran in 2007. In the same year, an investigation was carried out in Uruguay in an attempt to bring KH-2002s into the country through Venezuela, which was a violation of UN embargo rules against Iran, according to reports in the Washington Times. According to the article, all 18,000 rifles and 15,000 rounds of Iranian-made 5.56mm NATO ammunition were confiscated.

In 2008, Iran had sent ten samples of the KH-2002 to Syria in order to compete for a potential contract with the Syrian Army against the AK-74M. Eight KH-2002s used in field tests jammed numerous times, leaving two of them in working condition.

It has been suggested that production of the KH-2002 was discontinued in 2012 after DIO was unable to find customers willing to buy the assault rifle.

Design
The KH-2002 features a four-position fire selector lever which is situated toward the rear of the left side butt-stock behind magazine housing with the M16-type magazine release button on the right side of the magazine housing. The weapon is not entirely ambidextrous since the ejection port is located on the right side of the rifle. It uses the globally proliferate STANAG magazine and is typically fitted with 20- or 30-round magazines.

The selector offers semi-automatic, fully automatic and three-round burst options, with the safety selection in the forward position. It operates as a gas operated, rotating bolt-type rifle. The KH-2002 can be outfitted with an AK-type bayonet.

The DIO promotes the KH-2002 as a "low-recoil, highly accurate, lightweight" weapon, with "modular construction for easy maintenance" and a rotating bolt locking mechanism, presumably designed to facilitate ambidextrous firing, protected under a carrying handle that contains the rear sight. The carrying handle can also be used to mount optical or night sights.

The weight of the KH-2002 with the long barrel and an empty 30-round magazine is given as 3.7 kg. The weapon can also be fitted with an optional bipod and a bayonet. Field stripping the rifle is most likely based on the M16.

The Sama-type rifle has improvements made over initial production models such as having a longer carry handle to accommodate longer optics or scopes when it was released in 2009. Other improvements include a foregrip extension below the barrel to better handle the rifle, two picatinny rails on the receiver were included and the bolt carrier design changed to fit the ejection port.

According to an October 2013 report by SIPRI, it's suggested that China may have provided technical assistance to Iranian engineers in designing the rifle.

Variants
The variants consisted of the following:
 Assault Rifle: Standard barrel based on the M16A1.
 Carbine: Has a short barrel and no front sight.
 DMR: Has a longer barrel.

Users

Current operators
: Used in limited numbers.

Failed contracts
 : DIO competed with the KH-2002 against the AK-74M, which failed due to numerous jamming incidents.
 : A smuggling attempt was made by CAVIM and MODLEX (Ministry of Defence & Armed Forces Logistics of the Islamic Republic of Iran) officials in a bid to supply the Uruguayan military with new assault rifles to secure a potential contract, which failed.

References

Bibliography
 

5.56 mm assault rifles
Post–Cold War weapons of Iran
Bullpup rifles
Weapons and ammunition introduced in 2003
ArmaLite AR-10 derivatives
Assault rifles of Iran